Dumka Lok Sabha constituency is one of the 14 Lok Sabha (parliamentary) constituencies in Jharkhand state in eastern India. 

This constituency is reserved for the candidates belonging to the Scheduled tribes. This constituency covers the entire Jamtara district and parts of Dumka and Deoghar districts.

Assembly segments
Dumka Lok Sabha constituency comprises the following six Vidhan Sabha (legislative assembly) segments:

Members of Parliament

Election results

References

External links
 Dumka Constituency Election Result

Lok Sabha constituencies in Jharkhand